Hou Fanfan (Chinese: 侯凡凡; born 1950) is a Chinese physician. She is currently Professor of Internal Medicine and Director of the Department of Nephrology of Nanfang Hospital, Southern Medical University.

Biography 
Hou was born in Shanghai, 1950. She studied at the First Military Medical University in 1970 and passed her medical examinations in 1979. In 1993, she received a doctorate degree in medicine from Zhongshan Medical University. Between June 1995 and December 1998, she was a visiting researcher at Harvard Medical School. Since her return to China in 1999, she has been Director of the Institute of Nephrology of Southern Medical University.

Honours 
In 2009, she was named an academician of the Chinese Academy of Sciences.

In 2012, she was elected as fellow to the World Academy of Sciences.

Awards 

 2002 - "Technology Venus" of the General Logistics Department of the People's Liberation Army
 2004 - Ding Ying Technology award
 2005 - Chinese Physician award
 2006 - Ho Leung Ho Lee award

References 

1950 births
Living people
Physicians from Guangdong
Scientists from Guangdong